"Strip No More" is a single by Danish band Lukas Graham, about a stripper who has stopped stripping. The song was released as a digital download on 16 June 2015 through Then We Take the World. The song peaked at number one on the Danish Singles Chart. The song was written by Lukas Forchhammer, Christopher Steven Brown, Sebastian Fogh, Stefan Forrest, Morten Ristorp, Morten Pilegaard, Magnus Larsson, Brandon O'Bryant Beal and Mark Falgren.

Track listing

Chart performance

Release history

References

2015 songs
2015 singles
Lukas Graham songs
Number-one singles in Denmark
Songs written by Morten Ristorp
Songs written by Lukas Forchhammer
Songs written by Stefan Forrest
Songs written by Christopher Steven Brown